Warsaw is an unincorporated community in Jefferson County, in the U.S. state of Pennsylvania.

History
A post office was established at Warsaw in 1836, and remained in operation until 1913.

References

Unincorporated communities in Jefferson County, Pennsylvania
Unincorporated communities in Pennsylvania